Berd is a town and urban municipal community in the Berd Municipality of the Tavush Province of Armenia. The town is located to the west of the Tavush river,  from Yerevan, surrounded by low mountains. Near the city are the ruins of the Tavush fortress (10th century) and the Nor Varagavank and Khoranashat monasteries (12th century). Other monasteries nearby include Shkhmuradi, Srveghi, and Kaptavank.

Etymology
Berd ( Armenian: բերդ) means "fortress" or castle.  The small city was named Berd  because the ruins of the Tavush castle were located in the outskirts of Berd. The town was formerly known as Berdagyugh, Gamma''', Tavuzghala, Tauzkend, Volorut, Shlorut and Ghalakyand.  

History

Historically, the area of modern-day Berd was part of the Tuchkatak'' canton of Utik, the 12th province of Greater Armenia. 

Berd has also historical meaning  because In the 10th century it was the residence of the Armenian king Ashot Yerkat (Iron). Also, the fortress was unique because of its newly developed water supply system. 

The  Town was bombarded during the 2020 Armenian Azerbaijan clashes.

Demographics
As of the 2011 census, the population of the town is 7,957.

The population are mainly Armenians. However the town is home to around 200 Udis, who also belong to the Armenian Apostolic Church.

Economy
Berd and the surrounding areas are a major centre for agricultural products in Armenia. Fruits, tobacco and other types are produced in the surrounding farms. Other notable industries of Berd include wine-making, bee-keeping and animal husbandry.

Gallery

References 

Populated places in Tavush Province
Populated places established in the 10th century
Elizavetpol Governorate